The Namdong Line was a non-electrified secondary railway line of the Korean State Railway in South P'yŏngan Province, North Korea, from P'yŏngnam Onch'ŏn on the P'yŏngnam Line to Namdong, where it connected to the (now closed) Namdong Branch of the Sŏhae Line.

The line was used to transport coal from the Sŏhae Line to the thermal power plant at Namp'o. 

The line was closed sometime in the 2000s; the line was still depicted as active in the 2002 passenger timetable.  The tracks, as well as some of the bridges, have since been removed, and in places the right of way is in use as roadway.

Route 

A yellow background in the "Distance" box indicates that section of the line is not electrified.

References

Railway lines in North Korea
Standard gauge railways in North Korea